Colorimetric analysis is a method of determining the concentration of a chemical element or chemical compound in a solution with the aid of a color reagent. It is applicable to both organic compounds and inorganic compounds and may be used with or without an enzymatic stage.  The method is widely used in medical laboratories and for industrial purposes, e.g. the analysis of water samples in connection with  industrial water treatment.

Equipment
The equipment required is a colorimeter, some cuvettes and a suitable color reagent.  The process may be automated, e.g. by the use of an AutoAnalyzer or by flow injection analysis.  Recently, colorimetric analyses developed for colorimeters have been adapted for use with plate readers to speed up analysis and reduce the waste stream.

Non-enzymatic methods

Examples

Calcium
Calcium + o-cresolphthalein complexone → colored complex

Copper
Copper + bathocuproin disulfonate → colored complex

Creatinine
Creatinine + picrate → colored complex

Iron
Iron + bathophenanthroline disulfonate → colored complex

Phosphate (inorganic)
Phosphate + ammonium molybdate + ascorbic acid → blue colored complex

Enzymatic methods
In enzymatic analysis (which is widely used in medical laboratories) the color reaction is preceded by a reaction catalyzed by an enzyme.  As the enzyme is specific to a particular substrate, more accurate results can be obtained. Enzymatic analysis is always carried out in a buffer solution at a specified temperature (usually 37°C) to provide the optimum conditions for the enzymes to act. Examples follow.

Examples

Cholesterol (CHOD-PAP method)
 Cholesterol + oxygen --(enzyme cholesterol oxidase)--> cholestenone + hydrogen peroxide
 Hydrogen peroxide + 4-aminophenazone + phenol --(enzyme peroxidase)--> colored complex + water

Glucose (GOD-Perid method)
 Glucose + oxygen + water --(enzyme glucose oxidase)--> gluconate + hydrogen peroxide
 Hydrogen peroxide + ABTS --(enzyme peroxidase)--> colored complex
In this case, both stages of the reaction are catalyzed by enzymes.

Triglycerides (GPO-PAP method)
 Triglycerides + water --(enzyme esterase)--> glycerol + carboxylic acid
 Glycerol + ATP --(enzyme glycerol kinase)--> glycerol-3-phosphate + ADP
 Glycerol-3-phosphate + oxygen --(enzyme glycerol-3-phosphate oxidase) --> dihydroxyacetone phosphate + hydrogen peroxide
 Hydrogen peroxide + 4-aminophenazone + 4-chlorophenol --(enzyme peroxidase)--> colored complex

Urea
 Urea + water --(enzyme urease)--> ammonium carbonate
 Ammonium carbonate + phenol + hypochlorite ----> colored complex
In this case, only the first stage of the reaction is catalyzed by an enzyme. The second stage is non-enzymatic.

Abbreviations
 CHOD = cholesterol oxidase
 GOD = glucose oxidase
 GPO = glycerol-3-phosphate oxidase
 PAP = phenol + aminophenazone (in some methods the phenol is replaced by 4-chlorophenol, which is less toxic)
 Perid = peroxidase

Ultraviolet methods
In ultraviolet (UV) methods there is no visible color change but the principle is exactly the same, i.e. the measurement of a change in the absorbance of the solution. UV methods usually measure the difference in absorbance at 340 nm wavelength between nicotinamide adenine dinucleotide (NAD) and its reduced form (NADH).

Examples

Pyruvate

Pyruvate + NADH --(enzyme lactate dehydrogenase)--> L-lactate + NAD

See also
 Blood sugar
 MBAS assay, an assay that indicates anionic surfactants in water with a bluing reaction.
 Nessler cylinder

References

Analytical chemistry
Chemical reactions
Absorption spectroscopy